Long Island (also called Carpenter, Carpenter Station, and Carpenters Station) is an unincorporated community in the northeastern corner of Jackson County, Alabama, United States. Long Island appears on the Bridgeport U.S. Geological Survey Map.  It was reportedly named Carpenter for a family that lived there prior to 1852, when it was given the English form of the original Cherokee name of the village on the long island in the Tennessee River dating from 1783.

References

Unincorporated communities in Alabama
Unincorporated communities in Jackson County, Alabama
Populated places established in 1783